Michael Thomas Brace  (born 19 June 1950) is a former paralympic skier, social worker and leader of disabled charities.  He was Chief Executive of Vision 2020 UK (2001-2012) and served as Chairman of the British Paralympic Association (2001-2008).  He was blinded at the age of ten by an accident with a firework and subsequently attended Linden Lodge School for the Blind in Wimbledon.  He gained a Diploma in Social Work from the Polytechnic of North London in 1976 and in the same year competed as a cross-country skier in the inaugural Winter Paralympics.

Brace published the first volume of his autobiography Where there's a will in 1980.  He published the second volume in 2017, precised on his official web site. He was awarded the OBE in 2005 and CBE in 2009 for services to paralympic sport.

He was the subject of This Is Your Life in 1982 when he was surprised by Eamonn Andrews outside Bush House in London.

References

External links
Mike Brace's official website

1950 births
Commanders of the Order of the British Empire
Deputy Lieutenants of Greater London
Paralympic cross-country skiers of Great Britain
Cross-country skiers at the 1976 Winter Paralympics
British male cross-country skiers
People educated at Linden Lodge School
Alumni of the University of North London
Living people